The Fremad Association Building and adjacent Pope County State Bank Building are historic commercial properties in Glenwood, Minnesota.

Description and history 
They are listed together on the National Register of Historic Places for their local significance in commerce and architecture. They formed a hub of commerce in Pope County, Minnesota, from the late-19th to the mid-20th century, while the bank is further noted for its Neoclassical architecture.

See also
 National Register of Historic Places listings in Pope County, Minnesota

References

Buildings and structures in Pope County, Minnesota
Commercial buildings completed in 1919
Commercial buildings on the National Register of Historic Places in Minnesota
Neoclassical architecture in Minnesota
National Register of Historic Places in Pope County, Minnesota